The 2007 AHA Men's Ice Hockey Tournament was the 4th Atlantic Hockey Men's Ice Hockey Tournament. It was played between March 3 and March 17, 2007. Opening round games were played at home team campus sites, while the semifinals and championship games were played at the Blue Cross Arena in Rochester, New York. By winning the tournament, Air Force received Atlantic Hockey's automatic bid to the 2007 NCAA Division I Men's Ice Hockey Tournament.

Both Air Force and Rochester joined Atlantic Hockey for the 2006-07 season; however, due to their reclassification from Division III to Division I status, RIT was ineligible for the 2007 conference tournament. Because of this the tournament was returned to the same format it had been in 2004 and 2005, comprising all nine teams. This would be changed the following year when RIT would compete as a full D-I program.

Format
The tournament featured three rounds of play and a play-in game. All games in the tournament are single-elimination. The play-in game consists of the eighth and ninth seeds competing to decide the final qualifier. In the quarterfinals, the first seed plays the winner of the play-in game while the second and seventh seeds, the third and sixth seeds and the fourth and fifth seeds play to determine who advances to the semifinals. of the four remaining teams, the highest and lowest remaining ranked teams play each other with the other two teams facing one another to determine the championship participants. The tournament champion receives an automatic bid to the 2007 NCAA Men's Division I Ice Hockey Tournament.

RIT was ineligible to play in the tournament and all teams were reseeded accordingly.

Conference standings
Note: GP = Games played; W = Wins; L = Losses; T = Ties; PTS = Points; GF = Goals For; GA = Goals Against

Bracket
Teams are reseeded after the Quarterfinals

Note: * denotes overtime period(s)

Play-in

(8) Canisius vs. (9) American International

Quarterfinals

(1) Sacred Heart vs. (9) American International

(2) Army vs. (7) Bentley

(3) Connecticut vs. (6) Mercyhurst

(4) Air Force vs. (5) Holy Cross

Semifinals

(1) Sacred Heart vs. (4) Air Force

(2) Army vs. (3) Connecticut

Championship

(2) Army vs. (4) Air Force

Tournament awards

All-Tournament Team
G Andrew Volkening (Air Force)
D Tim Manthey (Army)
F Mike Phillipich* (Air Force)
F Bryce Hollweg (Army)
* Most Valuable Player(s)

References

Aha tournament
Atlantic Hockey Tournament